Four Japanese destroyers have been named :

See also 
 Ikazuchi (disambiguation)

Imperial Japanese Navy ship names
Japan Maritime Self-Defense Force ship names
Japanese Navy ship names